Although the United States Virgin Islands did not participate in the 2020 presidential election because it is a territory and not a state, it still participated in the U.S. presidential caucuses and primaries. Former vice president Joe Biden won the Democratic caucus, held on June 6. The Republican caucus, held on March 14 in the form of a territorial convention, voted for incumbent president Donald Trump.

Democratic caucuses
The U.S. Virgin Islands Democratic presidential caucuses were held on June 6, 2020 on multiple islands, in the Democratic Party primaries and caucuses for the 2020 presidential election alongside the Guam caucuses on the same day. The Virgin Islands caucuses were a closed caucus, with the territory awarding 13 delegates to the 2020 Democratic National Convention, of which 7 were pledged delegates allocated on the basis of the results of the caucuses. Former vice president and presumptive nominee Joe Biden overwhelmingly won all delegates with the highest result of the primary cycle of more than 91% of the vote, while the sole other candidate, senator Bernie Sanders, who still competed for delegates, only got 28 out of 550 votes, his lowest result in the primary cycle.

Procedure
When the U.S. Virgin Islands Democratic Party published its draft delegate selection plan on June 12, 2019, it specified a June 6 date for the 2020 caucuses, originally being the only entity voting on that day, before Guam postponed its caucus and joined the Virgin Islands on June 6, due to the COVID-19 pandemic.

Voting took place between 10:00 a.m. and 6:00 p.m. In the closed caucuses, candidates had to meet a threshold of 15 percent across the territory to be considered viable. The 7 pledged delegates to the 2020 Democratic National Convention were allocated proportionally on the basis of the results of the caucuses. Of these, all 7 were at-large pledged delegates. Originally planned with 6 delegates, the final number included a 20% bonus of 1 additional delegate by the Democratic National Committee due to the June date, which belonged to Stage III on the primary timetable.

The delegation also included 6 unpledged PLEO delegates: 4 members of the Democratic National Committee, one member of Congress (House of Representatives nonvoting delegate Stacey Plaskett), and the governor Albert Bryan.

Results

Republican caucuses
The U.S. Virgin Islands Republican presidential caucuses were scheduled to take place as a territorial convention on multiple islands on April 4, in the Republican Party primaries and caucuses for the 2020 presidential election, but due to the COVID-19 pandemic they were moved. Party chairman John Canegata controversially announced a caucus for May 30 only two days before, including a "presidential preference vote", even though his proposal for such a vote had been downvoted by the party in the past. Canegata gave multiple challenges in court and with the Republican National Committee against the legitimacy of his chairmanship as the reason for the late announcement. Of the 9 delegates, according to the standing local party rules, 6 would have been bound in the sense that they would be individually elected as delegates at the caucuses, while binding themselves to their preferred candidate. The other 3 would have been automatic delegates and unbound as party leaders. Assuming, however, that the party did a binding presidential preference vote even though not written in the local rules, this would mean under the 2015 national party rules that the automatic delegates would be bound by the result just as the other delegates, making 9 bound delegates.

There were no media reports or a press release about the outcome of the caucus at all, and virtually all delegate tracking sources like CNN or 270toWin did not contain results for the delegate allocation either. The Green Papers reported an unofficial result of around 90% for Donald Trump. As the Republican National Committee did not recognize Canegata as party chair, he was ultimately not allowed to attend the 2020 Republican National Convention, following a recommendation of the Committee on Contests, and the Virgin Islands' delegate votes were only read out by the convention secretary, without anyone representing the delegation.

References

External links
 The Green Papers Democratic Party delegate allocation summary
 The Green Papers Republican Party delegate allocation summary

United States Virgin Islands
United States presidential elections in the United States Virgin Islands
United States Virgin Islands
United States Virgin Islands
Presidential
United States Virgin Islands caucuses
United States Virgin Islands Republican caucuses